Claibourne Township is one of the fourteen townships of Union County, Ohio, United States.  The 2010 census found 3,519 people in the township, 2,229 of whom lived in the village of Richwood.

Geography
Located in the northeastern part of the county, it borders the following townships:
Jackson Township - north
Prospect Township, Marion County - northeast
Thompson Township, Delaware County - southeast
Leesburg Township - south
Taylor Township - southwest
York Township - west

The village of Richwood is located in central Claibourne Township.

Name and history
It is the only Claibourne Township statewide, and is named after the Buller Claibourne survey.  The township was organized in 1834.  As of 1854, the township was also known as 'Clairbourn', and the population was 919.

Government
The township is governed by a three-member board of trustees, who are elected in November of odd-numbered years to a four-year term beginning on the following January 1. Two are elected in the year after the presidential election and one is elected in the year before it. There is also an elected township fiscal officer, who serves a four-year term beginning on April 1 of the year after the election, which is held in November of the year before the presidential election. Vacancies in the fiscal officership or on the board of trustees are filled by the remaining trustees.

References

External links
County website

Townships in Union County, Ohio
Townships in Ohio